Amyema bifurcata is an epiphytic, flowering, hemiparasitic plant of the family Loranthaceae native to Australia and found in Western Australia, the Northern Territory, Queensland and New South Wales.

Description
Its inflorescence is an umbel of two or more pairs of flowers, which have rusty corollas covered with dense intertwined hairs. The fruit is globular, and the bract enlarges under the fruit. The leaves are flat.

Ecology
Amyema bifurcata is found on some 22 Eucalypt species, five Angophora species, on Acacia acuminata and on Nitraria billardierei.

Taxonomy
It was first described by Bentham in 1867 as Loranthus bifurcatus, with its genus being changed to Amyema by Tieghem in 1894.

References

bifurcata
Eudicots of Western Australia
Flora of the Northern Territory
Flora of Queensland
Flora of New South Wales
Parasitic plants
Epiphytes
Taxa named by George Bentham
Plants described in 1894